A tourbillon is a type of mechanical clock or watch escapement.

Tourbillon may also refer to:

 Château de Tourbillon, a castle in Sion, Switzerland
 Stade Tourbillon, a stadium in Sion, Switzerland
 Tourbillon (band), a Japanese band 
 Tourbillon (horse), French champion racehorse sire